The Janáček Academy of Music and Performing Arts (abbreviation in Czech: JAMU) is a public university with an artistic focus in Brno, Czech Republic. It was established in 1947 and consists of two faculties: the Faculty of Music and the Faculty of Theater.

Background
The Janáček Academy of Music and Performing Arts was established on 12 September 1947 and is named after classical composer Leoš Janáček.
Following the collapse of the Czech communist government in 1989, music and theatre faculties were re-established, a number of professors who had been unable to teach were brought back, young teachers were admitted to the staff, new fields of study were introduced, and foreign contacts were initiated. The institution soon gained wide recognition.

Honorary doctorates have been awarded to pianist Rudolf Firkušný (a native of Brno), poet Ludvík Kundera, playwright Václav Havel, and poet and actor Jiří Suchý. JAMU has more than 500 students at its two faculties.

The academy organises the annual Leoš Janáček Competition. The work of students at the Faculty of Music is presented to the public in the Chamber Opera, as well as through a series of public concerts continuing throughout the academic year.

References

External links

 Faculty of Theater website
 Faculty of Music website

 
Art schools in the Czech Republic
Music schools in the Czech Republic
Education in Brno
Organizations based in Brno
Buildings and structures in Brno
1947 establishments in Czechoslovakia
Educational institutions established in 1947